Márcio Santos (born 1969) is a Brazilian former football defender and 1994 World Cup winner

Márcio Santos may also refer to:

Márcio Santos (footballer, born 1979), Portuguese football goalkeeper
Marcio Santos (footballer, born 1987), Brazilian football midfielder
Márcio Santos (footballer, born 1998), Portuguese football forward